John Hampden (21 March 1653 – 12 December 1696), the second son of Richard Hampden, and grandson of Ship money tax protester John Hampden, returned to England after residing for about two years in France, and joined himself to William Russell and Algernon Sidney and the party opposed to the arbitrary government of Charles II. With Russell and Sidney, he was arrested in 1683 for alleged complicity in the Rye House Plot, but more fortunate than his colleagues his life was spared although, as he was unable to pay the fine of £40,000 which was imposed upon him, he remained in prison. Then in 1685, after the failure of Monmouth's rising, Hampden was again brought to trial, and on a charge of high treason was condemned to death. But the sentence was not carried out, and having paid £6000 he was set at liberty. In the Convention Parliament of 1689, he represented Wendover, but in the subsequent parliaments, he failed to secure a seat. It was Hampden who in 1689 coined the phrase "Glorious Revolution". He died by his own hand on 12 December 1696. Hampden wrote numerous pamphlets, and Bishop Burnet described him as "one of the learnedest gentlemen I ever knew".

He married Sarah Foley (died 1687), and had two children:
 Richard Hampden (aft. 1674 – 27 July 1728), an MP and Privy Counsellor
 Letitia Hampden, who married John Birch MP as his second wife

After her death, he married Anne Cornwallis and had two children:
 John Hampden (c. 1696 – 4 February 1754), an MP
 Ann Hampden (died September 1723), married Thomas Kempthorne

Notes

References

1653 births
1696 deaths
People from Buckinghamshire
People of the Rye House Plot
English MPs 1679
English MPs 1680–1681
English MPs 1681
English MPs 1689–1690
English politicians convicted of crimes
British politicians who committed suicide
Suicides by sharp instrument in England